This is a list of women artists who were born in Uruguay or whose artworks are closely associated with that country.

A
Bárbara Álvarez (born 1970), cinematographer

C
Agustina Casas Sere-Leguizamon (born 1984), digital artist

D
Águeda Dicancro (1938–2019), sculptor

F
Beatriz Flores Silva (born 1956), film director

H
Gabriela Hearst (born 1976), garment designer

M
Jill Mulleady (born 1980), painter

P
Virginia Patrone (born 1950), painter
Manolita Piña (1883–1994), painter

T
Ana Tiscornia (born 1951), visual artist

U
Mariví Ugolino (born 1943), sculptor

V
Petrona Viera (1895–1960), painter

Z
Guma Zorrilla (1919–2001), costume designer

External links

-
Uruguayan women artists, List of
Artists
Artists